Qualex-Landmark is a real estate development group based in Vancouver, British Columbia, Canada, founded by Reza Navabi and Mohammed Esfahani in 2001. The group, including founder communities built prior to 2001, has developed over 2,000 wood-frame and concrete high-rise condominiums in the Greater Vancouver Area and Calgary.

The Qualex-Landmark group has won several awards for innovative building design and environmental friendliness. Pomaria, a residential development completed in Vancouver, won the award for best high rise from the Urban Development Institute in 2007. Pomaria was also the first LEED certified high-rise residential development in Vancouver, the 3rd LEED Silver high-rise residential development in Canada, and includes geo-thermal heating, cooling, and several other environmentally sensitive features. Pomaria features a copper sculpture of Erasmus, created by acclaimed artist, Rodney Graham.

In 2017, ARIA residences in Vancouver, British Columbia attained the LEED Canada Gold Certification.

Mark on Tenth, a mixed-use residential high rise development completed in summer 2016 in Calgary, Alberta, has a large-scale art commission by Canadian visual artist and designer Douglas Coupland, Coupland's interpretation of Calgary, Alberta in the 21st century. Mark on Tenth is Qualex-Landmark's fifth residential tower in Calgary, Alberta.

Eighteen Trees, another residential development completed in Burnaby, BC won the Gold Georgie Award for best low-rise development in BC in 2000.

Qualex-Landmark group's projects have been designed by renowned architects such as Foad Rafii, described by The Vancouver Sun as one of the 10 architects who have shaped Vancouver today , RWA Group, IBI Group and James Cheng.

Developments

603-617 Tyndall Street & 803-807 North Road - 446 homes (strata and below market rental) proposed in Coquitlam, BC - Currently under municipal review
580-600 Harrison Avenue & 581-601 Kemsley Avenue - 239 residential units proposed in Coquitlam, BC - Currently under municipal review
Seasons - 116 residential rental units in Coquitlam, BC - Currently Under Construction
Artesia - 247 residential units in Burnaby, BC - Currently Under Construction
32 below market rental units in collaboration with non-profit group, YWCA 
Legacy on Dunbar - 48 residential units in Vancouver, BC - Completing Summer 2023
Green on Queensbury - 164 residential units in North Vancouver, BC  - Completed Spring 2020
 Park Point (Phase 1) - 287 residential units in Calgary, AB  - completed summer 2018
 The Nationals Awards - Silver Award for Best Architectural Design of an Attached Community, 2017
 The Nationals Awards - Silver Award for Best Interior Merchandising of a Model Under $350K, 2016
 The Nationals Awards - Silver Award for Best Presentation Centre, 2016
 Aria - 52 residential rental units in Vancouver, BC  - completed summer 2016
 Urban Development Institute British Columbia Awards for Excellence, 2016 - Winner for Excellence in Multi-Family Market Rental 
 Mark on Tenth - 274 residential units in Calgary, AB  - completed summer 2016
 BILD Awards of Excellence in Housing in Alberta, 2016 - Winner for Best Multi-Family Project 
 BILD Awards of Excellence in Housing in Alberta, 2016 - Winner for Best Multi-Family Apartment under $350,000
 The Nationals Awards - Silver Award for Best Clubhouse, 2015
 The Nationals Awards - Silver Award for Best Architectural Design, 2015
 The Nationals Awards - Silver Award for Best Interior Merchandising, 2015
 SAM Award winner for Best New Design, Apartment Style Condo up to 899 sq. ft., 2013
 SAM Award winner for Best New Design, Apartment Style Condo 900 sq. ft. and over, 2013
 SAM Award finalist for Best Sales & Information Centre (Detached), 2013
 Calla - 168 residential units in Calgary, AB, completed 2013
 SAM Award finalist for Best Multi-Family Community, 2013
 Luna - 218 residential units in Calgary, AB, completed 2012
 District Crossing - 126 residential units in North Vancouver, BC, completed 2011
 Nova - 188 residential units in Calgary, AB, completed 2008
 Pomaria - 138 residential units in Vancouver, BC, completed 2007
 Urban Development Institute prize for Best High Rise, 2007
 Stella - 161 residential units in Calgary, AB, completed 2006
 Domus - 125 residential units in Vancouver, BC, completed 2003

Founder developments prior to Qualex-Landmark

 Alda - 59 residential units in Vancouver, BC, completed 2002
 Symphony at Garibaldi - 30 residential units in Squamish, BC, completed 2001
 Eighteen Trees - 62 residential units in Burnaby, BC, completed 2000
 Gold Georgie Award for best low-rise development in BC, 2000
 Crandall - 32 residential units in Vancouver, BC, completed 2000
 Symphony at Whistler - 50 residential units in Whistler, BC, completed 1997
 Sinclaire Dental Headquarters - 33,000 sq. ft in North Vancouver, BC, completed 1996
 Rivergate - 39 residential units in Vancouver, BC, completed 1996
 Sonesta - 43 residential units in Vancouver, BC, completed 1996
 Antrim Oaks - 33 residential units in Burnaby, BC, completed 1996
 The Esplanade - 36 residential units in Port Coquitlam, BC, completed 1994
 Fairmont on the Boulevard - 110 residential units in Surrey, BC, completed 1994
 The Beacon - 44 residential units in Port Coquitlam, BC, completed 1991

References

External links
 Qualex-Landmark
 denotes trademark of Qualex-Landmark Living Inc.

Real estate companies of Canada
Companies based in Vancouver